Kolberg is an unincorporated community in the town of Brussels, in southern Door County, Wisconsin. County Road D connects the community to Forestville and to Brussels.

References

Unincorporated communities in Wisconsin
Unincorporated communities in Door County, Wisconsin